National road cycling championships are held annually by host nations in each cycle racing discipline. The annual events can take place at any time of the year. European nations usually holds their annual events in June, during a designed break in the professional calendar.

In road racing, winning riders of national championships are crowned as:

 Men's Elite Road Race Champion
 Men's Elite Time Trial Champion
 Women's Road Race Champion
 Women's Time Trial Champion
 Men's Under-23 Road Race Champion
 Men's Under-23 Time Trial Champion

National champion cycling jersey

A national champion cycling jersey is a cycling jersey awarded to the winning riders of each event at the national cycling championships sponsored by the national governing body and recognized by the Union Cycliste Internationale (UCI). The national champion cycling jersey is often colored and styled after that country's national flag, or else utilises the country's national colours.

Riders are authorized to wear an awarded national champion cycling jersey until next year's national championship. Afterwards, past champions may wear the national colors around the neckline and arm bands.

References

 
Road